Bulukumba Regency is a regency in the southeast corner of South Sulawesi Province, Indonesia. It covers an area of 1,154.58 km2, and had a population of 394,757 at the 2010 Census and 437,607 at the 2020 Census. The official estimate for mid 2021 was 440,090. The town of Ujung Bulu is its capital.

Administrative Districts 
Bulukumba Regency is divided into ten Districts (Kecamatan), tabulated below with their areas and their populations at the 2010 Census  and 2020 Census, together with the official estimates for mid 2021. The table also includes the locations of the district administrative centres, the number of villages (rural desa and urban kelurahan) in each district, and its postal code.

Note: (a) except villages of Tanah Kongkong (whose postcode is 92513), Bintarore (92514), Caile (92517) and Kalumeme (92518).

Pinisi ship
The traditional wooden Pinisi ships are built in Bulukumba, e.g. in Lemo-lemo village.

Climate
Bulukumba has a tropical monsoon climate (Am) with moderate to little rainfall from August to November and heavy rainfall from December to July. The following climate data is for the town of Bulukumba.

References

Regencies of South Sulawesi